"Murzynek Bambo" (Bambo the black child) is a children's poem by Jewish-Polish author Julian Tuwim (September 1894 – December 1953), written in 1934, which tells a story of a fictitious African child named Bambo. Tuwim's poem, which was said to have been written to promote tolerance toward other ethnicities during interwar Poland, is seen by many as highly controversial with critics accusing the author of perpetuating harmful racial stereotypes.

Analysis and controversy

Historical context 
The poem is sixteen lines long, arranged in eight rhyming couplets. It is said to have been written by Tuwim to teach Polish youth tolerance towards Black children, suggesting they are not different from their Polish counterparts. Historians note that Tuwim, who faced strong anti-Semitic sentiments during the interwar period, espoused liberal views and was strongly opposed to Polish nationalist politics and its discrimination against ethnic minorities.

The meaning of Murzynek 
The poem refers to Bambo as Murzynek, the diminutive form of Murzyn. Murzynek can be translated into English in a variety of ways, such as "black child". The word "Murzyn", which traditionally had not been considered offensive, has come to be seen as increasingly discriminatory and derogatory during the 21st century. The word was derived from borrowing the German word Mohr, which derived from Latin maurus, similar to the English word 'moor'.

Accusations of racism 
In recent decades, Murzynek Bambo has been accused of racism and of presenting a culturally and socio-economically demeaning view of Africans. Writer Patrycja Pirog notes that the poem is a "story of an enlightened Europe trying to civilize a savage" which, despite its seemingly innocuous nature, perpetuates harmful primitivist stereotypes of European colonialism and contributes to promoting racist attitudes toward Black people in contemporary Poland. In the opinion of Margaret Ohia, who researched racism in the Polish language at the University of California, the protagonist of the poem is presented as inferior to the presumably white reader. The phrase Murzynek Bambo is often used in children's name-calling when the target is a black child.

Other Polish critics contend that the contemporary claims of the poem's seeming racism are exaggerated and anachronistic. Referencing Alan Gribben's controversial attempt to expurgate Mark Twain's Tom Sawyer and Adventures of Huckleberry Finn, conservative journalist Adam Kowalczyk dismisses the notion that Murzynek Bambo promotes racism in Poland. A reader of Gazeta Wyborcza, a major liberal newspaper in Poland, Ewa Trzeszczkowska, describes in a letter how she identifies with Bambo: "For me, this work was and is a cheerful story about a naughty boy from a distant, exotic country, that, although so distant – both the country and the boy – is also similar to me. He has a joy of life which is expressed, amongst other ways, in the climbing of the trees (I climbed them too), and has a slight note of defiance, independence, liberty. Which was and is close to me!" She writes that she does not suspect "the author of these words of bad intentions", though she admits feeling discomfort reading that Bambo fears baths because he might become white.

Text
A little Murzyn Bambo lives in Africa
Our little friend has black skin
He studies all the mornings
His Murzynian ‘The First Textbook of Reading Skills’

And when he returns from school to home
He makes mischiefs, rollicks – it’s his job
Even mummy cries ‘Bambo, you scoundrel!’
And Bambo inflates his black face

Mummy says: ‘Drink some milk”
And he runs away on a tree
Mummy says ‘Go wash yourself’
And he’s afraid he would get white

But mummy loves his son
Because this little Murzyn is a good boy
It’s sad that black, cheerful Bambo
Doesn’t go with us to our school

See also
Little Black Sambo
Washing the Ethiopian white

References

<--Alphabetized-->
1924 poems
Africa in fiction
Afro-Polish history
Black people in literature
Child characters in literature
Controversies in Poland
Fictional African people
Polish poems
Race-related controversies in literature